Apiaceae or Umbelliferae is a family of mostly aromatic flowering plants (anthophytes) in the order Apiales. Apiaceae is named after the type genus Apium and commonly known as the celery, carrot or parsley family, or simply as umbellifers. It is the 16th-largest family of flowering plants, with more than 3,700 species in 434 genera It includes a significant number of phototoxic species, and a smaller number of highly poisonous species.

23,420 species of vascular plant have been recorded in South Africa, making it the sixth most species-rich country in the world and the most species-rich country on the African continent. Of these, 153 species are considered to be threatened. Nine biomes have been described in South Africa: Fynbos, Succulent Karoo, desert, Nama Karoo, grassland, savanna, Albany thickets, the Indian Ocean coastal belt, and forests.

The 2018 South African National Biodiversity Institute's National Biodiversity Assessment plant checklist lists 35,130 taxa in the phyla Anthocerotophyta (hornworts (6)), Anthophyta (flowering plants (33534)), Bryophyta (mosses (685)), Cycadophyta (cycads (42)), Lycopodiophyta (Lycophytes(45)), Marchantiophyta (liverworts (376)), Pinophyta (conifers (33)), and Pteridophyta (cryptogams (408)).

65 genera are represented in the literature. Listed taxa include species, subspecies, varieties, and forms as recorded, some of which have subsequently been allocated to other taxa as synonyms, in which cases the accepted taxon is appended to the listing. Multiple entries under alternative names reflect taxonomic revision over time.

Aethusa 
Genus Aethusa:
 Aethusa leptophylla (Pers.) Spreng. accepted as Cyclospermum leptophyllum (Pers.) Sprague ex Britton & P.Wilson

Afroligusticum 
Genus Afroligusticum:
 Afroligusticum thodei (T.H.Arnold) P.J.D.Winter, indig
 Afroligusticum wilmsianum (H.Wolff) P.J.D.Winter, endemic

Afrosciadium 
Genus Afrosciadium:
 Afrosciadium caffrum (Meisn.) P.J.D.Winter, indigenous
 Afrosciadium magalismontanum (Sond.) P.J.D.Winter, indigenous
 Afrosciadium natalense (Sond.) P.J.D.Winter, endemic
 Afrosciadium platycarpum (Sond.) P.J.D.Winter, endemic

Agrocharis 
Genus Agrocharis:
 Agrocharis melanantha Hochst. indigenous

Alepidea 
Genus Alepidea:
 Alepidea acutidens Weim. indigenous
 Alepidea acutidens Weim. var. acutidens, endemic
 Alepidea acutidens Weim. var. dispar Weim. endemic
 Alepidea amatymbica Eckl. & Zeyh. indigenous
 Alepidea amatymbica Eckl. & Zeyh. var. amatymbica endemic
 Alepidea amatymbica Eckl. & Zeyh. var. aquatica (Kuntze) Weim. endemic
 Alepidea amatymbica Eckl. & Zeyh. var. cordata Sond. accepted as Alepidea cordifolia B.-E.van Wyk
 Alepidea amatymbica Eckl. & Zeyh. var. microbracteata Weim. endemic
 Alepidea angustifolia Schltr. & H.Wolff, accepted as Alepidea peduncularis Steud. ex A.Rich.
 Alepidea attenuata Weim. indigenous
 Alepidea basinuda Pott, indigenous
 Alepidea basinuda Pott var. basinuda, indigenous
 Alepidea basinuda Pott var. subnuda Weim. endemic
 Alepidea capensis (P.J.Bergius) R.A.Dyer, indigenous
 Alepidea capensis (P.J.Bergius) R.A.Dyer var. capensis, endemic
 Alepidea capensis (P.J.Bergius) R.A.Dyer var. tenella (Schltr. & H.Wolff) Weim. endemic
 Alepidea cirsiifolia Schltr. & H.Wolff, endemic
 Alepidea comosa Dummer, accepted as Alepidea peduncularis Steud. ex A.Rich.
 Alepidea cordifolia B.-E.van Wyk, indigenous
 Alepidea delicatula Weim. endemic
 Alepidea duplidens Weim. endemic
 Alepidea galpinii Dummer, indigenous
 Alepidea gracilis Dummer, accepted as Alepidea peduncularis Steud. ex A.Rich.
 Alepidea insculpta Hilliard & B.L.Burtt, endemic
 Alepidea jenkinsii Pott, accepted as Alepidea peduncularis Steud. ex A.Rich.
 Alepidea longeciliata Schinz ex Dummer, endemic
 Alepidea longifolia E.Mey. ex Dummer subsp. lancifolia Weim. accepted as Alepidea peduncularis Steud. ex A.Rich.
 Alepidea longifolia E.Mey. ex Dummer subsp. swynertonii (Dummer) Weim. accepted as Alepidea peduncularis Steud. ex A.Rich.
 Alepidea longifolia E.Mey. ex Dummer var. angusta Dummer accepted as Alepidea peduncularis Steud. ex A.Rich.
 Alepidea longifolia E.Mey. ex Dummer var. longifolia accepted as Alepidea peduncularis Steud. ex A.Rich.
 Alepidea macowani Dummer, endemic
 Alepidea multisecta B.L.Burtt, endemic
 Alepidea natalensis J.M.Wood & M.S.Evans, indigenous
 Alepidea peduncularis Steud. ex A.Rich. indigenous
 Alepidea pilifera Weim. indigenous
 Alepidea pusilla Weim. indigenous
 Alepidea reticulata Weim. indigenous
 Alepidea serrata Eckl. & Zeyh. indigenous
 Alepidea serrata Eckl. & Zeyh. var. cathcartensis (Kuntze) Weim. endemic
 Alepidea serrata Eckl. & Zeyh. var. serrata endemic
 Alepidea setifera N.E.Br. indigenous
 Alepidea stellata Weim. indigenous
 Alepidea thodei Dummer, indigenous
 Alepidea woodii Oliv. indigenous
 Alepidea wyliei Dummer, accepted as Alepidea peduncularis Steud. ex A.Rich.

Ammi 
Genus Ammi:
 Ammi majus L. not indigenous
 Ammi majus L. var. glaucifolium (L.) Godr. not indigenous, invasive

Anginon 
Genus Anginon:
 Anginon difforme (L.) B.L.Burtt, endemic
 Anginon fruticosum I.Allison & B.-E.van Wyk, endemic
 Anginon intermedium I.Allison & B.-E.van Wyk, endemic
 Anginon jaarsveldii B.L.Burtt, endemic
 Anginon paniculatum (Thunb.) B.L.Burtt, endemic
 Anginon pumilum I.Allison & B.-E.van Wyk, endemic
 Anginon rugosum (Thunb.) Raf. endemic
 Anginon swellendamensis (Eckl. & Zeyh.) B.L.Burtt, endemic
 Anginon tenuior I.Allison & B.-E.van Wyk, endemic
 Anginon ternatum I.Allison & B.-E.van Wyk, endemic
 Anginon uitenhagense (Eckl. & Zeyh.) B.L.Burtt, accepted as Anginon rugosum (Thunb.) Raf.
 Anginon verticillatum (Sond.) B.L.Burtt, indigenous

Annesorhiza 
Genus Annesorhiza:
 Annesorhiza altiscapa Schltr. endemic
 Annesorhiza articulata Magee, endemic
 Annesorhiza asparagoides B.-E.van Wyk, endemic
 Annesorhiza bracteosa Magee, endemic
 Annesorhiza burttii B.-E.van Wyk, endemic
 Annesorhiza calcicola Magee & J.C.Manning, endemic
 Annesorhiza elata Eckl. & Zeyh. accepted as Annesorhiza grandiflora (Thunb.) M.Hiroe
 Annesorhiza elsiae Vessio, Tilney & B.-E.van Wyk, endemic
 Annesorhiza fibrosa B.-E.van Wyk, endemic
 Annesorhiza filicaulis Eckl. & Zeyh. endemic
 Annesorhiza flagellifolia Burtt Davy, endemic
 Annesorhiza grandiflora (Thunb.) M.Hiroe, endemic
 Annesorhiza hirsuta Eckl. & Zeyh. accepted as Annesorhiza grandiflora (Thunb.) M.Hiroe
 Annesorhiza lateriflora (Eckl. & Zeyh.) B.-E.van Wyk, endemic
 Annesorhiza laticostata Magee, endemic
 Annesorhiza latifolia Adamson, endemic
 Annesorhiza macrocarpa Eckl. & Zeyh. endemic
 Annesorhiza marlothii H.Wolff, accepted as Annesorhiza lateriflora (Eckl. & Zeyh.) B.-E.van Wyk
 Annesorhiza nuda (Aiton) B.L.Burtt, endemic
 Annesorhiza radiata Magee, endemic
 Annesorhiza refracta Magee, endemic
 Annesorhiza schlechteri H.Wolff, endemic
 Annesorhiza thunbergii B.L.Burtt, endemic
 Annesorhiza triternata (Eckl. & Zeyh.) Vessio, Tilney & B.-E.van Wyk, endemic
 Annesorhiza villosa (Thunb.) Sond. accepted as Annesorhiza grandiflora (Thunb.) M.Hiroe
 Annesorhiza wilmsii H.Wolff, indigenous

Anthriscus 
Genus Anthriscus:
 Anthriscus sylvestris (L.) Hoffm. var. sylvestris, not indigenous

Apium 
Genus Apium:
 Apium ammi Urb. var. leptophyllum (Pers.) Chodat & Wilczek, accepted as Cyclospermum leptophyllum (Pers.) Sprague ex Britton & P.Wilson
 Apium decumbens Eckl. & Zeyh. indigenous
 Apium graveolens L. not indigenous, invasive
 Apium integrifolium Hayata, accepted as Apium graveolens L.	
 Apium inundatum (L.) Rchb.f. accepted as Helosciadium inundatum (L.) W.D.J.Koch, not indigenous
 Apium leptophyllum (Pers.) F.Muell. ex Benth. accepted as Cyclospermum leptophyllum (Pers.) Sprague ex Britton & P.Wilson

Arctopus 
Genus Arctopus:
 Arctopus dregei Sond. endemic
 Arctopus echinatus L. endemic
 Arctopus monacanthus Carmich. ex Sond. endemic

Berula 
Genus Berula:
 Berula erecta (Huds.) Coville subsp. thunbergii (DC.) B.L.Burtt, accepted as Berula thunbergii (DC.) H.Wolff, indigenous
 Berula repanda (Hiern) Spalik & S.R.Downie, indigenous
 Berula thunbergii (DC.) H.Wolff, indigenous

Bupleurum 
Genus Bupleurum:
 Bupleurum capitatum (L.f.) Thunb. accepted as Hermas capitata L.f.	
 Bupleurum ciliatum (L.f.) Thunb. accepted as Hermas ciliata L.f.	
 Bupleurum giganteum (L.f.) Thunb. accepted as Hermas gigantea L.f.	
 Bupleurum mundii Cham. & Schltdl. indigenous
 Bupleurum quinquedentatum (L.f.) Thunb. accepted as Hermas quinquedentata L.f.	
 Bupleurum rotundifolium L. not indigenous
 Bupleurum villosum L.	accepted as Hermas villosa (L.) Thunb.

Buprestis 
Genus Buprestis:
 Buprestis gigantea (L.f.) Spreng. accepted as Hermas gigantea L.f.

Capnophyllum 
Genus Capnophyllum:
 Capnophyllum africanum (L.) Gaertn. endemic
 Capnophyllum africanum (L.) Gaertn. var. leiocarpon Sond. accepted as Capnophyllum leiocarpon (Sond.) J.C.Manning & Goldblatt
 Capnophyllum leiocarpon (Sond.) J.C.Manning & Goldblatt, endemic
 Capnophyllum lutzeyeri Magee & B.-E.van Wyk, indigenous
 Capnophyllum macrocarpum Magee & B.-E.van Wyk, indigenous

Carum 
Genus Carum:
 Carum graveolens (L.) Koso-Pol. accepted as Apium graveolens L.

Caucalis 
Genus Caucalis:
 Caucalis platycarpos L. not indigenous

Celeri 
Genus Celeri:
 Celeri graveolens (L.) Britton, accepted as Apium graveolens L.

Centella 
Genus Centella:
 Centella affinis (Eckl. & Zeyh.) Adamson, indigenous
 Centella affinis (Eckl. & Zeyh.) Adamson var. affinis, endemic
 Centella affinis (Eckl. & Zeyh.) Adamson var. oblonga Adamson, endemic
 Centella annua M.T.R.Schub. & B.-E.van Wyk, endemic
 Centella asiatica (L.) Urb. indigenous
 Centella brachycarpa M.T.R.Schub. & B.-E.van Wyk, endemic
 Centella caespitosa Adamson, endemic
 Centella calcaria M.T.R.Schub. & B.-E.van Wyk, indigenous
 Centella calliodus (Cham. & Schltdl.) Drude, indigenous
 Centella capensis (L.) Domin, endemic
 Centella capensis (L.) Domin var. micrantha Adamson, accepted asCentella annua M.T.R.Schub. & B.-E.van Wyk
 Centella cochlearia (Domin) Adamson, indigenous
 Centella comptonii Adamson, indigenous
 Centella coriacea Nannf. endemic
 Centella cryptocarpa M.T.R.Schub. & B.-E.van Wyk, indigenous
 Centella debilis (Eckl. & Zeyh.) Drude, endemic
 Centella dentata Adamson, endemic
 Centella didymocarpa Adamson, endemic
 Centella difformis (Eckl. & Zeyh.) Adamson, endemic
 Centella dolichocarpa M.T.R.Schub. & B.-E.van Wyk, endemic
 Centella dregeana (Sond.) Domin, accepted as Centella tridentata (L.f.) Drude ex Domin var. dregeana (Sond.) M.T.R.Schub. & B.-E.van Wyk
 Centella eriantha (Rich.) Drude, indigenous
 Centella eriantha (Rich.) Drude var. eriantha, endemic
 Centella eriantha (Rich.) Drude var. orientalis Adamson, endemic
 Centella eriantha (Rich.) Drude var. rotundifolia Adamson, endemic
 Centella flexuosa (Eckl. & Zeyh.) Drude, endemic
 Centella fourcadei Adamson, endemic
 Centella fusca (Eckl. & Zeyh.) Adamson, endemic
 Centella glabrata L. indigenous
 Centella glabrata L. var. bracteata Adamson, endemic
 Centella glabrata L. var. glabrata, endemic
 Centella glabrata L. var. natalensis Adamson, indigenous
 Centella glauca M.T.R.Schub. & B.-E.van Wyk, endemic
 Centella graminifolia Adamson, indigenous
 Centella gymnocarpa M.T.R.Schub. & B.-E.van Wyk, endemic
 Centella hermanniifolia (Eckl. & Zeyh.) Domin, accepted as Centella tridentata (L.f.) Drude ex Domin
 Centella hermanniifolia (Eckl. & Zeyh.) Domin var. littoralis (Eckl. & Zeyh.) Domin, accepted as Centella tridentata (L.f.) Drude ex Domin var. litoralis (Eckl. & Zeyh.) M.T.R.Schub. & B.-E.van Wyk
 Centella laevis Adamson, endemic
 Centella lanata Compton, endemic
 Centella lasiophylla Adamson, endemic
 Centella linifolia (L.f.) Drude, indigenous
 Centella linifolia (L.f.) Drude var. depressa Adamson, endemic
 Centella linifolia (L.f.) Drude var. linifolia, endemic
 Centella longifolia (Adamson) M.T.R.Schub. & B.-E.van Wyk, endemic
 Centella macrocarpa (Rich.) Adamson, indigenous
 Centella macrocarpa (Rich.) Adamson var. macrocarpa, endemic
 Centella macrocarpa (Rich.) Adamson var. saxatilis Adamson, endemic
 Centella macrodus (Spreng.) B.L.Burtt, endemic
 Centella montana (Cham. & Schltdl.) Domin, endemic
 Centella montana (Cham. & Schltdl.) Domin var. longifolia Adamson, accepted as Centella longifolia (Adamson) M.T.R.Schub. & B.-E.van Wyk
 Centella pilosa M.T.R.Schub. & B.-E.van Wyk, endemic
 Centella pottebergensis Adamson, endemic
 Centella recticarpa Adamson, endemic
 Centella restioides Adamson, endemic
 Centella rupestris (Eckl. & Zeyh.) Adamson, endemic
 Centella scabra Adamson, endemic
 Centella sessilis Adamson, endemic
 Centella stenophylla Adamson, endemic
 Centella stipitata Adamson, endemic
 Centella ternata M.T.R.Schub. & B.-E.van Wyk, endemic
 Centella thesioides M.T.R.Schub. & B.-E.van Wyk, endemic
 Centella tridentata (L.f.) Drude ex Domin, indigenous
 Centella tridentata (L.f.) Drude ex Domin var. dregeana (Sond.) M.T.R.Schub. & B.-E.van Wyk, endemic
 Centella tridentata (L.f.) Drude ex Domin var. hermanniifolia (Eckl. & Zeyh.) M.T.R.Schub. & B.-E.van Eyk, endemic
 Centella tridentata (L.f.) Drude ex Domin var. litoralis (Eckl. & Zeyh.) M.T.R.Schub. & B.-E.van Wyk, endemic
 Centella tridentata (L.f.) Drude ex Domin var. tridentata, endemic
 Centella triloba (Thunb.) Drude, endemic
 Centella umbellata M.T.R.Schub. & B.-E.van Wyk, endemic
 Centella villosa L. indigenous
 Centella villosa L. var. latifolia (Eckl. & Zeyh.) Adamson, endemic
 Centella villosa L. var. villosa, endemic
 Centella virgata (L.f.) Drude, indigenous
 Centella virgata (L.f.) Drude var. congesta Adamson, endemic
 Centella virgata (L.f.) Drude var. gracilescens Domin, endemic
 Centella virgata (L.f.) Drude var. virgata, endemic

Chamarea 
Genus Chamarea:
 Chamarea capensis (Thunb.) Eckl. & Zeyh. endemic
 Chamarea esterhuyseniae B.L.Burtt. endemic
 Chamarea gracillima (H.Wolff) B.L.Burtt, endemic
 Chamarea longipedicellata B.L.Burtt, indigenous
 Chamarea snijmaniae B.L.Burtt, endemic

Choritaenia 
Genus Choritaenia:
 Choritaenia capensis Benth. endemic

Conium 
Genus Conium:
 Conium chaerophylloides (Thunb.) Sond. indigenous
 Conium fontanum Hilliard & B.L.Burtt, indigenous
 Conium fontanum Hilliard & B.L.Burtt var. alticola Hilliard & B.L.Burtt, indigenous
 Conium fontanum Hilliard & B.L.Burtt var. fontanum, indigenous
 Conium fontanum Hilliard & B.L.Burtt var. silvaticum Hilliard & B.L.Burtt, endemic
 Conium hilliburttorum Magee & Clark, endemic
 Conium maculatum L. not indigenous
 Conium sp. 4 accepted as Conium hilliburttorum, Magee & Clark	
 Conium sphaerocarpum Hilliard & B.L.Burtt, endemic

Coriandrum 
Genus Coriandrum:
 Coriandrum sativum L.	not indigenous

Cyclospermum 
Genus Cyclospermum:
 Cyclospermum leptophyllum (Pers.) Sprague, accepted as Cyclospermum leptophyllum (Pers.) Sprague ex Britton & P.Wilson
 Cyclospermum leptophyllum (Pers.) Sprague ex Britton & P.Wilson, not indigenous

Cynorhiza 
Genus Cynorhiza:
 Cynorhiza bolusii Magee & B.-E.van Wyk, indigenous
 Cynorhiza meifolia (Eckl. & Zeyh.) Magee, endemic
 Cynorhiza montana Eckl. & Zeyh. accepted as Cynorhiza typica Eckl. & Zeyh.
 Cynorhiza olifantiana Koso-Pol. accepted as Cynorhiza typica Eckl. & Zeyh.
 Cynorhiza sulcata Eckl. & Zeyh. accepted as Cynorhiza typica Eckl. & Zeyh.
 Cynorhiza typica Eckl. & Zeyh. endemic

Dasispermum 
Genus Dasispermum:
 Dasispermum capense (Lam.) Magee & B.-E.van Wyk, endemic
 Dasispermum grandicarpum Magee & B.-E.van Wyk, indigenous
 Dasispermum hispidum (Thunb.) Magee & B.-E.van Wyk, endemic
 Dasispermum humile (Meisn.) Magee & B.-E.van Wyk, endemic
 Dasispermum perennans Magee & B.-E.van Wyk. indigenous
 Dasispermum suffruticosum (P.J.Bergius) B.L.Burtt, endemic
 Dasispermum tenue (Sond.) Magee & B.-E.van Wyk, endemic

Daucus 
Genus Daucus:
 Daucus carota L. not indigenous

Deverra 
Genus Deverra:
 Deverra burchellii (DC.) Eckl. & Zeyh. indigenous
 Deverra denudata (Viv.) Pfisterer & Podlech, indigenous
 Deverra denudata (Viv.) Pfisterer & Podlech subsp. aphylla (Cham. & Schltdl.) Pfisterer & Podlech, indigenous

Diplolophium 
Genus Diplolophium:
 Diplolophium buchananii (Benth. ex Oliv.) C.Norman subsp. swynnertonii (Baker f.) Cannon, accepted as Diplolophium swynnertonii (Baker f.) C.Norman, indigenous
 Diplolophium swynnertonii (Baker f.) C.Norman, indigenous

Dracosciadium 
Genus Dracosciadium:
 Dracosciadium italae Hilliard & B.L.Burtt, endemic
 Dracosciadium saniculifolium Hilliard & B.L.Burtt, endemic

Dregea 
Genus Dregea:
 Dregea collina Eckl. & Zeyh.	Notobubon collinum (Eckl. & Zeyh.) Magee, indigenous

Ezosciadium 
Genus Ezosciadium:
 Ezosciadium capense (Eckl. & Zeyh.) B.L.Burtt, endemic

Ferula 
Genus Ferula:
 Ferula stricta Spreng. accepted as Nanobubon strictum (Spreng.) Magee

Foeniculum 
Genus Foeniculum:
 Foeniculum vulgare Mill. var. vulgare, not indigenous

Glia 
Genus Glia:
 Glia decidua B.-E.van Wyk, indigenous
 Glia pilulosa B.-E.van Wyk, indigenous
 Glia prolifera (Burm.f.) B.L.Burtt, endemic

Helodium 
Genus Helodium:
 Helodium inundatum (L.) Dumort. accepted as Helosciadium inundatum (L.) W.D.J.Koch

Helosciadium 
Genus Helosciadium:
 Helosciadium graveolens (L.) Rojas, accepted as Apium graveolens L.	
 Helosciadium inundatum (L.) W.D.J.Koch, not indigenous
 Helosciadium leptophyllum (Pers.) DC.	accepted as Cyclospermum leptophyllum (Pers.) Sprague ex Britton & P.Wilson

Hermas 
Genus Hermas:
 Hermas capitata L.f. endemic
 Hermas capitata L.f. var. minima (Eckl. & Zeyh.) Sond. accepted as Hermas capitata L.f.	
 Hermas ciliata L.f. endemic
 Hermas depauperata L. accepted as Hermas villosa (L.) Thunb.	
 Hermas gigantea L.f. endemic
 Hermas intermedia C.Norman, endemic
 Hermas lanata (Hill) Magee, indigenous
 Hermas minima Eckl. & Zeyh. accepted as Hermas capitata L.f.	
 Hermas pillansii C.Norman, accepted as Hermas lanata (Hill) Magee, endemic
 Hermas proterantha B.J.de Villiers, indigenous
 Hermas quercifolia Eckl. & Zeyh. indigenous
 Hermas quinquedentata L.f. endemic
 Hermas uitenhagensis Eckl. & Zeyh. accepted as Hermas ciliata L.f. indigenous
 Hermas villosa (L.) Thunb. indigenous
 Hermas villosa (L.) Thunb. var. depauperata DC. accepted as Hermas villosa (L.) Thunb.

Heteromorpha 
Genus Heteromorpha:
 Heteromorpha arborescens (Spreng.) Cham. & Schltdl. indigenous
 Heteromorpha arborescens (Spreng.) Cham. & Schltdl. var. abyssinica (Hochst. ex A.Rich.) H.Wolff, indigenous
 Heteromorpha arborescens (Spreng.) Cham. & Schltdl. var. arborescens endemic
 Heteromorpha arborescens (Spreng.) Cham. & Schltdl. var. collina (Eckl. & Zeyh.) Sond. endemic
 Heteromorpha arborescens (Spreng.) Cham. & Schltdl. var. frutescens P.J.D.Winter, indigenous
 Heteromorpha involucrata Conrath, indigenous
 Heteromorpha pubescens Burtt Davy, endemic
 Heteromorpha stenophylla Welw. ex Schinz var. transvaalensis (Schltr. & H.Wolff) P.J.D.Winter, indigenous
 Heteromorpha transvaalensis Schltr. & H.Wolff, accepted as Heteromorpha stenophylla Welw. ex Schinz var. transvaalensis (Schltr. & H.Wolff) P.J.D.Winter
 Heteromorpha trifoliata (H.L.Wendl.) Eckl. & Zeyh. accepted as Heteromorpha arborescens (Spreng.) Cham. & Schltdl. var. abyssinica (Hochst. ex A.Rich.) H.Wolff

Ifdregea 
Genus Ifdregea:
 Ifdregea collina (Eckl. & Zeyh.) Steud. accepted as Notobubon collinum (Eckl. & Zeyh.) Magee, indigenous

Itasina 
Genus Itasina:
 Itasina filifolia (Thunb.) Raf. endemic

Lefebvrea 
Genus Lefebvrea:
 Lefebvrea grantii (Hiern) S.Droop, indigenous

Lichtensteinia 
Genus Lichtensteinia:
 Lichtensteinia crassijuga E.Mey. ex Sond. indigenous
 Lichtensteinia globosa B.-E.van Wyk & Tilney, endemic
 Lichtensteinia interrupta (Thunb.) Sond. endemic
 Lichtensteinia kolbeana Bolus, accepted as Lichtensteinia interrupta, (Thunb.) Sond.
 Lichtensteinia lacera Cham. & Schltdl. endemic
 Lichtensteinia latifolia Eckl. & Zeyh. endemic
 Lichtensteinia obscura (Spreng.) Koso-Pol. endemic
 Lichtensteinia trifida Cham. & Schltdl. indigenous
 Lichtensteinia trifida Cham. & Schltdl. var. palmata (DC.) Sond. endemic
 Lichtensteinia trifida Cham. & Schltdl. var. pinnatifida Sond. endemic
 Lichtensteinia trifida Cham. & Schltdl. var. trifida, endemic

Meum 
Genus Meum:
 Meum inundatum (L.) Spreng. accepted as Helosciadium inundatum (L.) W.D.J.Koch

Nanobubon 
Genus Nanobubon:
 Nanobubon capillaceum (Thunb.) Magee, endemic
 Nanobubon hypogaeum Magee, endemic
 Nanobubon strictum (Spreng.) Magee, endemic
 Notobubon capense (Eckl. & Zeyh.) Magee, indigenous
 Notobubon collinum (Eckl. & Zeyh.) Magee, endemic
 Notobubon ferulaceum (Thunb.) Magee, endemic
 Notobubon galbaniopse (H.Wolff) Magee, endemic
 Notobubon galbanum (L.) Magee, endemic
 Notobubon gummiferum (L.) Magee, endemic
 Notobubon laevigatum (Aiton) Magee, indigenous
 Notobubon montanum (Eckl. & Zeyh.) Magee, endemic
 Notobubon pearsonii (Adamson) Magee, endemic
 Notobubon pungens (Sond.) Magee, endemic
 Notobubon sonderi (M.Hiroe) Magee, endemic
 Notobubon striatum (Thunb.) Magee, endemic
 Notobubon tenuifolium (Thunb.) Magee, endemic

Oreoselinum 
Genus Oreoselinum:
 Oreoselinum capense Eckl. & Zeyh. accepted as Notobubon capense (Eckl. & Zeyh.) Magee

Pastinaca 
Genus Pastinaca:
 Pastinaca sativa L. not indigenous

Perfoliata 
Genus Perfoliata:
 Perfoliata capitata (L.f.) Kuntze, Hermas capitata L.f.	
 Perfoliata ciliata (L.f.) Kuntze, accepted as Hermas ciliata L.f.	
 Perfoliata gigantea (L.f.) Kuntze, accepted as Hermas gigantea L.f.	
 Perfoliata quinquedentata (L.f.) Kuntze, accepted as Hermas quinquedentata L.f.	
 Perfoliata villosa (L.) Kuntze, accepted as Hermas villosa (L.) Thunb.

Petroselinum 
Genus Petroselinum:
 Petroselinum crispum (Mill.) A.W.Hill, not indigenous

Peucedanum 
Genus Peucedanum:
 Peucedanum caffrum (Meisn.) E.Phillips, accepted as Afrosciadium caffrum (Meisn.) P.J.D.Winter, indigenous
 Peucedanum camdebooense B.L.Burtt, accepted as Notobubon laevigatum (Aiton) Magee, endemic
 Peucedanum capense (Thunb.) Sond. var. capense, accepted as Notobubon laevigatum (Aiton) Magee, indigenous
 Peucedanum capense (Thunb.) Sond. var. lanceolatum Sond. accepted as Notobubon laevigatum (Aiton) Magee, indigenous
 Peucedanum capillaceum Thunb. accepted as Nanobubon capillaceum (Thunb.) Magee	
 Peucedanum capillaceum Thunb. var. rigidum Sond.  accepted as Nanobubon capillaceum (Thunb.) Magee, endemic
 Peucedanum collinum (Eckl. & Zeyh.) D.Dietr. accepted as Notobubon collinum (Eckl. & Zeyh.) Magee, indigenous
 Peucedanum dregeanum D.Dietr.	accepted as Notobubon montanum (Eckl. & Zeyh.) Magee, endemic
 Peucedanum ecklonis Walp. accepted as Nanobubon capillaceum (Thunb.) Magee	
 Peucedanum ferulaceum (Thunb.) Eckl. & Zeyh. var. ferulaceum, accepted as Notobubon ferulaceum (Thunb.) Magee, endemic
 Peucedanum ferulaceum (Thunb.) Eckl. & Zeyh. var. stadense (Eckl. & Zeyh.) Sond. accepted as Notobubon ferulaceum (Thunb.) Magee, endemic
 Peucedanum galbaniopse H.Wolff, accepted as Notobubon galbaniopse (H.Wolff) Magee
 Peucedanum gummiferum (L.) Wijnands, accepted as Notobubon gummiferum (L.) Magee, endemic
 Peucedanum hypoleucum (Meisn.) Drude, accepted as Notobubon tenuifolium (Thunb.) Magee
 Peucedanum kamiesbergense B.L.Burtt,  accepted as Notobubon capense (Eckl. & Zeyh.) Magee, endemic
 Peucedanum lateriflorum (Eckl. & Zeyh.) Sond. accepted as Annesorhiza lateriflora (Eckl. & Zeyh.) B.-E.van Wyk
 Peucedanum magalismontanum Sond. accepted as Afrosciadium magalismontanum (Sond.) P.J.D.Winter, indigenous
 Peucedanum millefolium Sond. accepted as Cynorhiza meifolia (Eckl. & Zeyh.) Magee, endemic
 Peucedanum multiradiatum Drude, accepted as Notobubon capense (Eckl. & Zeyh.) Magee
 Peucedanum natalense (Sond.) Engl. accepted as Afrosciadium natalense (Sond.) P.J.D.Winter, endemic
 Peucedanum olifantianum (Koso-Pol.) M.Hiroe, accepted as Cynorhiza typica Eckl. & Zeyh. indigenous
 Peucedanum pearsonii Adamson accepted as Notobubon pearsonii (Adamson) Magee, endemic
 Peucedanum platycarpum E.Mey. ex Sond. accepted as Afrosciadium platycarpum (Sond.) P.J.D.Winter, endemic
 Peucedanum polyactinum B.L.Burtt, accepted as Notobubon capense (Eckl. & Zeyh.) Magee
 Peucedanum pungens E.Mey. ex Sond. accepted as Notobubon pungens (Sond.) Magee, endemic
 Peucedanum rigidum Eckl. & Zeyh. accepted as Nanobubon capillaceum (Thunb.) Magee	
 Peucedanum sieberianum Sond. accepted as Nanobubon strictum (Spreng.) Magee	
 Peucedanum sonderi (M.Hiroe) B.L.Burtt, accepted as Notobubon sonderi (M.Hiroe) Magee
 Peucedanum striatum (Thunb.) Sond. accepted as Notobubon striatum (Thunb.) Magee, endemic
 Peucedanum strictum (Spreng.) B.L.Burtt, accepted as Nanobubon strictum (Spreng.) Magee, endemic
 Peucedanum sulcatum Eckl. & Zeyh. ex Sond. accepted as Cynorhiza typica Eckl. & Zeyh. endemic
 Peucedanum tenuifolium Thunb.	accepted as Notobubon tenuifolium (Thunb.) Magee, endemic
 Peucedanum thodei T.H.Arnold, accepted as Afroligusticum thodei (T.H.Arnold) P.J.D.Winter, indigenous
 Peucedanum triternatum Eckl. & Zeyh.  accepted as Annesorhiza triternata (Eckl. & Zeyh.) Vessio, Tilney & B.-E.van Wyk, endemic
 Peucedanum typicum (Eckl. & Zeyh.) B.L.Burtt, accepted as Cynorhiza typica Eckl. & Zeyh. endemic
 Peucedanum upingtoniae (Schinz) Drude, accepted as Lefebvrea grantii (Hiern) S.Droop, indigenous
 Peucedanum wilmsianum H.Wolff, accepted as Afroligusticum wilmsianum (H.Wolff) P.J.D.Winter, endemic
 Peucedanum zeyheri Steud. accepted as Nanobubon capillaceum (Thunb.) Magee

Pimpinella 
Genus Pimpinella:
 Pimpinella caffra (Eckl. & Zeyh.) D.Dietr. indigenous
 Pimpinella hydrophila H.Wolff, endemic
 Pimpinella krookii H.Wolff, endemic
 Pimpinella leptophylla Pers.  accepted as Cyclospermum leptophyllum (Pers.) Sprague ex Britton & P.Wilson
 Pimpinella reenensis Rech.f. accepted as Pimpinella stadensis (Eckl. & Zeyh.) D.Dietr.
 Pimpinella schlechteri H.Wolff, endemic
 Pimpinella stadensis (Eckl. & Zeyh.) D.Dietr. indigenous
 Pimpinella transvaalensis H.Wolff, indigenous

Polemannia 
Genus Polemannia:
 Polemannia grossulariifolia Eckl. & Zeyh. endemic
 Polemannia montana Schltr. & H.Wolff, indigenous
 Polemannia simplicior Hilliard & B.L.Burtt, indigenous

Polemanniopsis 
Genus Polemanniopsis:
 Polemanniopsis marlothii (H.Wolff) B.L.Burtt, endemic

Ptychotis 
Genus Ptychotis:
 Ptychotis carvifolia Sond. accepted as Carum carvifolium Benth. & Hook.f.

Sanicula 
Genus Sanicula:
 Sanicula elata Buch.-Ham. ex D.Don, indigenous

Scaraboides 
Genus Scaraboides:
 Scaraboides manningii Magee & B.-E.van Wyk, endemic

Seseli 
Genus Seseli:
 Seseli graveolens (L.) Scop. accepted as Apium graveolens L.	
 Seseli striatum Thunb. accepted as Notobubon striatum (Thunb.) Magee, indigenous

Sison 
Genus Sison:
 Sison inundatum L. accepted as Helosciadium inundatum (L.) W.D.J.Koch

Sium 
Genus Sium:
 Sium apium Roth, accepted as Apium graveolens L.	
 Sium graveolens (L.) Vest, accepted as Apium graveolens L.	
 Sium inundatum (L.) Lam. accepted as Helosciadium inundatum (L.) W.D.J.Koch	
 Sium repandum Hiern, accepted as Berula repanda (Hiern) Spalik & S.R.Downie, indigenous
 Sium thunbergii DC. accepted as Berula thunbergii (DC.) H.Wolff

Sonderina 
Genus Sonderina:
 Sonderina caruifolia (Sond.) H.Wolff, accepted as Dasispermum hispidum (Thunb.) Magee & B.-E.van Wyk, endemic
 Sonderina hispida (Thunb.) H.Wolff, accepted as Dasispermum hispidum (Thunb.) Magee & B.-E.van Wyk, endemic
 Sonderina humilis (Meisn.) H.Wolff accepted as Dasispermum humile (Meisn.) Magee & B.-E.van Wyk, endemic
 Sonderina streyi Merxm. accepted as Anginon streyi (Merxm.) I.Allison & B.-E.van Wyk	
 Sonderina tenuis (Sond.) H.Wolff, accepted as Dasispermum tenue (Sond.) Magee & B.-E.van Wyk, endemic

Steganotaenia 
Genus Steganotaenia:
 Steganotaenia araliacea Hochst. indigenous
 Steganotaenia araliacea Hochst. var. araliacea, indigenous

Stenosemis 
Genus Stenosemis:
 Stenosemis angustifolia E.Mey. ex Sond. endemic
 Stenosemis caffra (Eckl. & Zeyh.) Sond. endemic

Stoibrax 
Genus Stoibrax:
 Stoibrax capense (Lam.) B.L.Burtt, accepted as Dasispermum capense (Lam.) Magee & B.-E.van Wyk, endemic

Torilis 
Genus Torilis:
 Torilis arvensis (Huds.) Link, not indigenous
 Torilis nodosa (L.) Gaertn. not indigenous

Turgenia 
Genus Turgenia:
 Turgenia latifolia (L.) Hoffm. not indigenous, invasive

References

South African plant biodiversity lists
Apiaceae